The Holy Savior Cathedral ( – Surb Amenaprkich Vank;  – Kelisā ye Āmenāperkič), also known the Church of the Saintly Sisters, is a cathedral located in the New Julfa district of Isfahan, Iran. It is commonly referred to as the Vank, which means "monastery" or "convent" in the Armenian language.

History
The cathedral was established in 1606, built by the hundreds of thousands of Armenians who were forcibly resettled by Shah Abbas I in his new capital as part of his scorched-earth policy in Armenia during the Ottoman War of 1603-1618.

The varying fortunes and independence of this suburb across the Zayande River and its eclectic mix of European missionaries, mercenaries and travelers can be traced almost chronologically in the cathedral's combination of building styles and contrasts in its external and internal architectural treatment.

Construction
The construction is believed to have begun in 1606 by the first arrivals, and completed with major alterations to design between 1655 and 1664 under the supervision of Archbishop David. The cathedral consists of a domed sanctuary, much like an Iranian mosque, but with the significant addition of a semi-octagonal apse and raised chancel usually seen in western churches. The cathedral's exteriors are in relatively modern brickwork and are exceptionally plain compared to its elaborately decorated interior.

Frescos
The interior is covered with fine frescos and gilded carvings and includes a wainscot of rich tile work. The delicately blue and gold painted central dome depicts the Biblical story of the creation of the world and man's expulsion from Eden. Pendentives throughout the church are painted with a motif of a cherub's head surrounded by folded wings typical of Armenian art. The ceiling above the entrance is painted with delicate floral motifs in the style of Persian miniature. Two sections, or bands, of murals run around the interior walls: the top section depicts events from the life of Jesus, while the bottom section depicts tortures inflicted upon Armenian martyrs by the Ottoman Empire.

Courtyard
The courtyard contains a large freestanding belfry towering over the graves of both Orthodox and Protestant Christians. The graves include those of Sir George Malcolm, an English army officer, Alexander Decover, Russian consul and banker, and Andrew Jukes, English surgeon and agent of the British government. A tile work plaque inscribed in Armenian can be seen by the entrance to the cathedral. Graves are also placed along the exterior wall before the entrance, with inscriptions in Armenian. In one corner of the courtyard, there is a raised area with a memorial to the 1915 Armenian genocide in Turkey. Across the courtyard and facing the cathedral, there is a building housing a library and museum. Outside of this building are several carved stones showing scenes from the Bible.

Library and museum

The library contains over 700 handwritten books and many valuable and unique resources for research in Armenian and medieval European languages and arts. The museum displays numerous artifacts from the history of the cathedral and the Armenian community in Isfahan, including:
 the 1606 edict of Shah Abbas I establishing New Julfa;
 several edicts by Abbas I and his successors condemning and prohibiting interference with, or persecution of, Armenians and their property and affairs;
 a historic printing press and the first book printed in Iran;
 vestments, monstrances, chalices, and other sacramental artifacts;
 Safavid costumes, tapestries, European paintings brought back by Armenian merchants, embroidery, and other treasures from the community's trading heritage;
 ethnological displays portraying aspects of Armenian culture and religion;
 an extensive display of photographs, maps, and Turkish documents (with translation) related to the 1915 Armenian genocide in Turkey.

The cathedral has greatly influenced the architecture and decorative treatment of many subsequent Orthodox churches in the region.

See also

New Julfa
Fereydan
Holy Saviour Monastery of Old Julfa

References

External links
More Photos, Tishineh

Armenian Apostolic cathedrals
Armenian Apostolic churches in Iran
Oriental Orthodox congregations established in the 17th century
Churches in Isfahan
Tourist attractions in Isfahan
Armenian Apostolic cathedrals in Iran
1606 establishments in Iran
17th-century churches in Iran